Sarah Mehain (born 12 January 1995) is a Canadian Paralympic swimmer.

Mehain studied sustainable sciences at McGill University in Montreal and can speak English and French. she has cerebral palsy and is hemiplegic.

She has participated at the Paralympic Games in 2012 and 2016. She won a silver medal at the 2018 Commonwealth Games in the 50 metre butterfly S7 event.

References

External links
 
 

1995 births
Living people
Commonwealth Games silver medallists for Canada
Paralympic swimmers of Canada
People from Nelson, British Columbia
Sportspeople from British Columbia
Swimmers at the 2012 Summer Paralympics
Swimmers at the 2016 Summer Paralympics
Swimmers at the 2018 Commonwealth Games
Commonwealth Games medallists in swimming
Medalists at the World Para Swimming Championships
Medalists at the 2015 Parapan American Games
Canadian female butterfly swimmers
Canadian female backstroke swimmers
Canadian female freestyle swimmers
S7-classified Paralympic swimmers
21st-century Canadian women
Medallists at the 2018 Commonwealth Games